The 2013–14 NHL Three Star Awards are the way the National Hockey League denotes its players of the week and players of the month of the 2013–14 season.

Weekly

Monthly

No February stars were named due to the Olympic break

Rookie of the month

No February stars were named due to the Olympic break

See also
Three stars (ice hockey)
2013–14 NHL season
2013–14 NHL suspensions and fines
2013–14 NHL transactions
2013 NHL Entry Draft
2013 in sports
2014 in sports
2012–13 NHL Three Star Awards

References

Three Star Awards
Lists of NHL Three Star Awards